Sir Edward Dillon Lott du Cann  (28 May 1924 – 31 August 2017) was a British politician and businessman.  He was a member of Parliament (MP) from 1956 to 1987 and served as Chairman of the Conservative Party from 1965 to 1967 and as chairman of the party's 1922 Committee from 1972 to 1984.

Early life
Du Cann was educated at Colet Court, Woodbridge School and St John's College, Oxford, where he was a friend of Kingsley Amis. During the Second World War, he was commissioned as an officer in the Royal Navy. Serving as a lieutenant in motor torpedo boats based in East Anglia patrolling the North Sea, he served alongside both Owen Aisher (later a yachtsman and entrepreneur) and David Wickins (the founder of British Car Auctions and an entrepreneur). At the end of the war, he became a company director.

Political career
In 1951, du Cann contested Walthamstow West and, in 1955, Barrow-in-Furness, on both occasions without success. He was elected as MP for Taunton in a 1956 by-election. Du Cann served as the Economic Secretary to the Treasury from 1962 and as a Minister of State at the Board of Trade 1963–64. He was then the chairman of the Conservative Party from 1965 to 1967, and chairman of the 1922 Committee from 1972 to 1984. He was sworn of the Privy Council in 1964.

In 1974, du Cann played a part in the events surrounding the elevation of Margaret Thatcher to the leadership of the Conservative Party.  Following two narrow defeats for the Conservatives at the polls, in the February and October general elections, significant disquiet in the party had developed over the leadership of Edward Heath, who had lost three elections as leader.  On 14 October, the executive of the 1922 Committee met at du Cann's home, amidst a good deal of press attention.

That was soon followed by a more public meeting of the executive at du Cann's offices at Keyser Ullman, on Milk Street, where it was decided that the committee would press Heath to hold a leadership election. The location of this meeting led to Fleet Street nicknaming the attendees the "Milk Street Mafia". As Alec Douglas-Home, at Heath's request, considered the procedures for a leadership election, there was some speculation that du Cann would himself stand as a representative of the party's right wing against Heath.

By the time Douglas-Home reported in December 1974, however, events had intervened. The devastating collapse of the banking boom had swept up du Cann's firm, Keyser Ullman, in its path. He was criticized as "incompetent" by a 1974 Department of Trade and Industry report regarding the bankrupt Keyser Ullman bank, of which he was a director. Du Cann did not put himself forward as a candidate in the leadership contest. This released key support for Margaret Thatcher, especially as another potential right-wing candidate, Keith Joseph, withdrew from any leadership attempt following a series of controversial speeches on social policy. Consequently, after defeating Heath in the first round, Thatcher emerged triumphant in the second round in early 1975, defeating a number of other candidates who would play significant roles in her subsequent premiership.

In the last week of the 1975 referendum on British membership of the European Economic Community, du Cann came out against British membership. He was chairman of the Public Accounts Committee from 1974 to 1979.

Post-political retirement
Du Cann retired from the House of Commons in 1987, selling his home Cothay Manor in 1993 and returning to live in London. He was instrumental in creating a scholarship programme for rugby league players at the University of Oxford.

Du Cann succeeded Duncan Sandys as chairman of Lonrho, a position from which he was forced to resign due to his role as deputy chairman of Homes Assured, a finance company which crashed. His resignation came two days before the company collapsed, owing £10 million to creditors. Du Cann was involved in several legal disputes over debts; his Somerset estate was repossessed in 1992 and his London flat was repossessed in 1993. He later had a bankruptcy order served against him.

He was a board member of E-Clear, a British payment processing company, which went into administration in January 2010.

Personal life
He married three times; first, in 1962, to Sally (a cousin), whom he divorced in 1987, then to Jennifer (the widow of Robert Cooke, former MP for Bristol West), whom he married in 1990 and was with until her death in 1995. He was declared bankrupt in 1993 and lived for several years in Alderney. As of 2013 he was a resident of Lemona in Cyprus. He died in 2017 and is survived by his third wife, Maureen Hope-Wynne.

References

External links 
 
 

1924 births
2017 deaths
Chairmen of the 1922 Committee
Chairmen of the Conservative Party (UK)
Conservative Party (UK) MPs for English constituencies
Knights Commander of the Order of the British Empire
Members of the Privy Council of the United Kingdom
Ministers in the Macmillan and Douglas-Home governments, 1957–1964
People educated at Woodbridge School
Royal Navy officers of World War II
UK MPs 1955–1959
UK MPs 1959–1964
UK MPs 1964–1966
UK MPs 1966–1970
UK MPs 1970–1974
UK MPs 1974
UK MPs 1974–1979
UK MPs 1979–1983
UK MPs 1983–1987